E. lagunensis may refer to:

 Euphorbia lagunensis, a poisonous plant
 Eumeces lagunensis, a skink native to the Baja California peninsula